John Olu-Molomo is a retired American soccer defender who played professionally in the Continental Indoor Soccer League and National Professional Soccer League.

Olu-Molomo grew up in Nigeria and attended Government College of Ibadan from 1978 to 1983.  In 1988, he entered Loma Linda University to pursue a post-graduate degree.  He began playing intramural soccer at Loma Linda.  This led to him playing for the U.S. International University men’s soccer team in 1990.  In 1992, Olu-Molomo joined the Tucson Amigos of the USISL at mid-season when the team was 1-7. Tucson ended the season by losing in the championship game to the Palo Alto Firebirds.  Olu-Molomo was All League.  In 1994, Olu-Molomo signed with the San Diego Sockers of the Continental Indoor Soccer League.  Olu-Molomo was the 1994 CISL Rookie of the Year  On August 23, 1996, the Sockers traded Olu-Molomo to the Seattle SeaDogs.  Olu-Molomo finished the 1996 season with Seattle, then spent the entire 1997 CISL season with Seattle, winning the league championship with them.  In September 1997, the Edmonton Drillers selected Olu-Molomo in the National Professional Soccer League draft.  On November 6, 1997, Edmonton traded Olu-Molomo to the Philadelphia KiXX in exchange for Ziad Allen.  Olu-Molomo played for the KiXX that season.  In 1998, the Florida Thundercats under the direction of former SeaDogs' coach Fernando Clavijo entered the NPSL.  Clavijo brought much of the Seattle team, including Olu-Molomo, to the Thundercats.  In February 1999, the Thundercats sent Olu-Molomo back to the Philadelphia KiXX.  In 1999, Olu-Molomo played one season with the Dallas Sidekicks of the World Indoor Soccer League.

References

Living people
1968 births
Continental Indoor Soccer League players
Dayton Dynamo players
Dallas Sidekicks (WISL) players
Florida ThunderCats players
National Professional Soccer League (1984–2001) players
Nigerian footballers
Nigerian expatriate footballers
Philadelphia KiXX players
San Diego Sockers (CISL) players
Seattle SeaDogs players
Tucson Amigos players
USISL players
World Indoor Soccer League players
Association football midfielders
Association football forwards
Sportspeople from Ibadan